The 2016–17 Loyola Marymount Lions men's basketball team represented Loyola Marymount University during the 2016–17 NCAA Division I men's basketball season. The Lions were led by third-year head coach Mike Dunlap. They played their home games at Gersten Pavilion in Los Angeles, California as members of the West Coast Conference. They finished the season 15–15, 8–10 in WCC play to finish in sixth place. They lost in the quarterfinals of the WCC tournament to BYU.

Previous season
The Lions finished the 2015–16 season 14–17, 6–12 in WCC play to finish in a three-way tie for seventh place. They defeated San Diego in the first round of the WCC tournament before losing to Saint Mary's in the quarterfinals.

Offseason

Departures

Incoming transfers

2016 recruiting class

2017 Recruiting class

Roster

Schedule and results

|-
!colspan=12 style=| Exhibition

|-
!colspan=12 style=| Non-conference regular season

|-
!colspan=12 style=| WCC regular season

|-
!colspan=12 style=| WCC tournament

References

Loyola Marymount Lions men's basketball seasons
Loyola Marymount
Loyola Marymount
Loyola Marymount
Loyola Marymount
Loyola Marymount